Multai is a town and a Nagar Palika in Betul district in the Indian state of Madhya Pradesh. Multai is one of the southern cities of Madhya Pradesh, occupying almost half of the Satpura plateau. Considering the small villages around, it occupies a large area in width of the Satpura range between the valley of the Narmada on the north and the barer plains on the south. Forests lie to the west of the city between the districts of East Nimar and Amaraoti. It lies on the Northern bank of the Tapti and the place is also known for being the origin of the Tapti river.

Geography
It has an average elevation of 749  metres (2457  feet). Multai is the holy place and origin for river Tapti. The daughter of Surya, the Sun God, Mata Tapti is worshiped here in two different temples Prachin Mandir and Naveen Mandir. The Multai town is decorated on Akhad Saptami Tapti Janmotsav and an annual Mela is organized on this occasion. In Multai town there are many ancient Hindu Temples, dedicated to Lord Shiva and Hanuman.Gurdwara Singh Sabha Guru Nanak Darbar Multai commemorates here visit of Guru Nanak first guru of the Sikhs in 1515. According to legend Guru Nanak stayed here around 15 days and had discourse with king of Raisin at that time.

Boundaries

Multai is bounded on the north by town Amla, on the south by Amravati district of Maharashtra, on the east by Chhindwara District and on the west by the District Betul. The southern boundary of the city runs almost along the southern foothills of the Melghat range, but excludes Hatti Ghat and Chikaldara hills in Amravati district.
Jambadi (6 KM), Sandiya (7 KM), Sirsawadi (7 KM), Karpa (8 KM), Narkhed (9 KM) are the nearby Villages to Multai. Multai is surrounded by Prabhat Pattan Tehsil towards south, Amla Tehsil towards north, Warud Tehsil towards south, Pandhurna Tehsil towards east .

Demographics
 India census, Multai is a Municipality city in district of Betul, Madhya Pradesh. Multai city is divided into 15 wards for which elections are held every 5 years. The Multai Municipality has a population of 29,976 of which 15,356 are males while 14,620 are females as per the report released by Census India 2011.

Population of children with aged 0-6 is 3345 which is 11.16% of total population of Multai (M). In Multai Municipality, female sex ratio is 952 against state average of 931. Child sex ratio in Multai is around 910 compared to Madhya Pradesh state average of 918. Literacy rate of Multai city is 88.10% higher than the state average of 69.32%. In Multai, male literacy is around 91.61% while the female literacy rate is 84.42%.

Multai Municipality has total administration over 6,674 houses to which it supplies basic amenities like water and sewerage. It is also authorize to build roads within Municipality limits and impose taxes on properties coming under its jurisdiction.

Multai is well connected to its neighboring districts Amaravati, Betul, Amla, Nagpur, Chhindwara through rail and road. The nearest airport is Nagpur Airport (120 km) away which is well connected to Multai with frequent buses and taxi services round the clock.

Origin
The original name of the city Multai was Multapi, named after the river Tapti that originates from here. During the Maratha regime and British rule, Multai was one of the regional headquarters connecting the District Headquarter in the north to the District Headquarter 'Nagpur' of Central India.

During the Maratha regime and British rule, Multai was one of the regional headquarters connecting the District Headquarter in the north to the District Headquarter 'Nagpur' of Central India.

The city has a vivid culture due to a variety of religions and traditions in practice. The northern part of the district of Multai has a touch of Bundelkhandi language and culture. The southern belt of the district has overtone of Marathi language and Maharastrian culture. The rest of the district is predominantly tribal, populated by the Gonds and Korkus, who worship Baba Mahadev, practice rituals of animal sacrifice and follow superstitions. They use natural herbs for healthcare and medication. Major castes includes Pawar, kunbi, Raghuwanshi, Dhakad/Kirar, Rajput etc and Schedule Caste (SC) constitutes 13% while Schedule Tribe (ST) were 18.2% of total population in Multai Tehsil. The Sex Ratio of Multai Tehsil is 970 . Thus for every 1000 men there were 970 females in Multai Tehsil. Also as per Census 2011, the Child Sex Ration was 968 which is less than Average Sex Ratio ( 970 ) of Multai Tehsil.

The Tapti River

The Tapti River is one of the best place for tourism in Betul district.

Origin
'Tapti' also spelled as 'Tapi' is one of the major rivers in India. The total length of the Tapi river is approximately 724 km. It flows in the central parts of India. The river originates from Multai in Betul district of Madhya Pradesh in the Satpura range at an elevation of 752 meter above the sea level. The states through which the Tapi river flows include Maharashtra, Gujarat and Madhya Pradesh. Apart from the Narmada river, Tapi is the only river which flows in the westward direction and merges into the Arabian Sea. The Tapi basin extends to the total area of 65, 145 sq km, which is approximately 2.0% of the total geographical area of India. The main tributaries of the Tapi river are Purna, The Girna, The Panjhra, The Vaghur, the Bori and the Aner.

Religious significance
According to legend, Tapi river also known as Tapti, is the daughter of Surya (the Sun God). Some says that Surya created the Tapi river in order to save himself from his own intense heat. The river finds mention in the great Indian epic Mahabharata, according to which Tapti had married Sanvaran, a legendary hero of the moon dynasty. Tapti and Sanvaran also had the son called Kuru. It was on his name only the Kuru dynasty started. Tapi is considered as the Goddess among the Hindus and is worshiped among them . Multai Is known as pilgrimage place for Sikhs as Guru Nanak first guru of Sikhs visited the place in 1515 and stayed here for 14 days, during which he had discourse with king of Raisen Kadtur Ali.

References

Populated places on the Tapti River
Cities and towns in Betul district
Religion in Madhya Pradesh
Tourist attractions in Madhya Pradesh